Popovo may refer to:
Popovo, Bulgaria, a town in Bulgaria
Popovo, Leningrad Oblast, a rural locality (a station settlement) in Leningrad Oblast, Russia
Popovo, Moscow Oblast, a rural locality (a village) in Moscow Oblast, Russia
Popovo, Novgorod Oblast, a rural locality (a village) in Novgorod Oblast, Russia
Popovo, Tver Oblast, a rural locality (a village) in Tver Oblast, Russia
Popovo (župa), medieval county in what is now Bosnia and Herzegovina
Popovo Polje, a karstic field in Bosnia and Herzegovina

See also
Popov
Popovka (disambiguation)
Popowo (disambiguation)